U.S. Route 830 (US 830) was a U.S. Highway in Washington, which ran between a junction with US 97 near the city of Maryhill and a junction with US 101 near Ilwaco. The route still (mostly) exists; however it is currently signed as State Route 14 (SR 14) between Maryhill and Vancouver, Interstate 5 (I-5) between Vancouver and Longview, SR 432 for a short stretch through Longview; and SR 4 from Longview to the western terminus near Ilwaco. The number suggests that US 830 was an auxiliary route of US 30. While US 30 and US 830 never connected, they ran parallel to each other for the entire length of US 830. This route ran on the northern bank of the Columbia River (through Washington) whereas US 30 runs on the river's southern bank, through Oregon.

History

US 830 was created in 1926 as part of the initial set of United States Numbered Highways, running from US 101 at Megler to US 97 near Maryhill. When it existed, US 830 was the highest-numbered route in the U.S. Highway System (and remains the highest U.S. route number ever used). The highest numbered route still in existence is US 730.

The stretch of (former) US 830 which is now I-5 ran concurrently with US 99 at one point. The stretch of US 830 between Maryhill and Dalleport was formerly concurrent with US 197 from 1952 onward; now Dallesport is the northern terminus of US 197.

US 830 was decommissioned in 1968 and was replaced by SR 4, I‑5, and SR 14.

Major intersections

See also

 List of United States Numbered Highways

Notes

References

External links

 Historic endpoints of U.S. Highway 830

8
30-8
30-8
Transportation in Pacific County, Washington
Transportation in Wahkiakum County, Washington
Transportation in Clark County, Washington
Transportation in Skamania County, Washington
Transportation in Klickitat County, Washington
30-8
Columbia River Gorge